Amphibious Construction Battalion TWO (abbreviated as ACB 2, or PHIBCB 2)  is an amphibious construction battalion in the United States Navy based in Little Creek, Virginia. Amphibious Construction Battalion ONE is its sister unit based in Coronado, California.

Mission 

PHIBCB TWO combines the small craft expertise of the surface navy with the construction capabilities of the Naval Construction Force. We support Commander, Naval Beach Group Two in amphibious force projection with fully trained, combat ready forces.

History

 

ACB 2 has its beginnings in World War II.  It started out as the 105th Naval Construction Battalion.  She was commissioned 24 July 1943 at Camp Peary.  From there she was sent to Camp Parks, in California, and then to Advance Base Depot Port Hueneme. While there the battalion became part of movie history by providing the men and equipment for staging portions of the filming of The Fighting Seabees. At Port Hueneme the 105th boarded the United States Army Transport Sea Devil bound for New Guinea via Townsville, Australia.  There, she would join the 7th Fleet at Naval Base Milne Bay, Milne Bay and her sister battalion the 104th.  At Milne, the  primary tasks were the construction of an Amphibious Training Center, the battalion's camp, a Liberty ship pier, and a tank farm on Swinger Bay (adjacent the  Coral Sea).  The Seabee's historian William Huie states that if all the warehouses built by the 105th at Milne were combined it would create a structure 40' x 75,000' (15 miles).   The battalion also assisted the Army with the construction of Turnbull Field on Stringer bay.

The battalion also had several detachments. One went to Hilimoi Bay to help the 91st CB build a hospital for shipment to a forward site.  Another 150 men built a second sawmill to augment the one being run by the 84th CB at Milne Bay.  Of note are two 105 specialized details of divers that traveled over a hundred miles on undisclosed missions.  Milne Bay is one of the most malaria infested regions of the world and the 105th was there from January to October 1944. That month, several  LSTs arrived to embark the battalion for Island "X".  En route they laid up a few days at Hollandia.  On 24 October 1944, or D-plus 4, the battalion landed at Tacloban, Leyte.  The 105th was the first  entire Seabee Battalion to land in the Philippines.  Also landing at Tacloban were the 75th CB and the 1024 CBD (they all were part of the 12th Construction Regiment).  The 104th would be sent there too. The following day, 400 men were sent to Anabong Point. 12 November saw the rear echelon arrive at San Pedro Bay, Leyte, from Milne Bay.  On that same day, the OIC at Anabong Point sent a detachment to San Antonio, Northern Samar. Before the war was over there would be additional detachments sent to Talosa, Guiuan, Balingaga, and Osmena.  The 105th's cruisebook states "the 105th is a battalion distinguished only by its normalcy."  In the Philippines, she built an airfield, roads, barracks, camps and water tanks.  During the first 31 days she came under air attack 138 times.  On V-J Day, there were 32,000 Seabees in Subic Bay including those in the 105th.  The battalion made itself a reputation known as far back as Australia for "moonlight acquisition" activities.

During WWII there were five battalions tasked with pontoons, barges and the building of ship to shore causeways: CBs 70, 81, 111, 128, and 302. The 105th Naval Construction Battalion was recommissioned 22 January 1947 at Little Creek, Virginia, and was placed under the operational control of Commander, Amphibious Training Command, U.S. Atlantic Fleet.  At this time, the battalion "absorbed the duties and materials of the old Pontoon Training Unit of COMPHIBTRALANT".  When Naval Beach Group Two was established in 1948, the 105th NCB became a component of that command. In October 1949, the 1st NCB was recommissioned at Little Creek also.  The Navy changed CB designations that year and they both became Mobile Construction Battalions MCBs. This lasted less than a year for the 105th because the battalion was re-designated Amphibious Construction Battalion 2 (PHIBCB 2) in 1950.  By the time the Korean War broke out the Naval Construction force had been reduced to 2,800 men, MCB 1, ACB 1, and ACB 2. That quickly changed by December as the force was rapidly expanded.

From 1972 to 1975, ACB 2 was a component of Naval Inshore Warfare Command following the decommissioning of Naval Beach Group 2. However, ACB 2 once again became a component of Naval Beach Group 2 when it was recommissioned in 1975.

Since World War II, ACB 2 has distinguished itself in multiple operations including:
 "Passage to Freedom" Task Force 90  The 1954 Geneva agreement recognizing the Communist government of North Vietnam allowed for people residing in the North to move south before 15 May 1955.   Both ACBs were assigned to TF-90.
 Operation Blue Bat –  1958 Lebanon crisis
 Multinational Force in Lebanon August 1982 to February 1984
 Operation Urgent Fury October 1983 Grenada
 Operation Sharp Edge in Liberia in 1991
 Operations Desert Shield and Desert Storm in 1990–1991
 Operation Uphold Democracy in Haiti in 1994
 TWA Flight 800 and EgyptAir Flight 990 disaster recovery efforts 
 Joint Task Force Katrina  2005
 Operation Iraqi Freedom
 Operation Unified Response 2010 Haiti earthquake.

Tektite I

On 28 January 1969 a detachment from Amphibious Construction Battalion 2 augmented by an additional 17 Seabee divers from both the Atlantic and Pacific fleets as well as the 21st NCR began the installation of the Tektite habitat in Great Lameshur Bay at Lameshur, U.S. Virgin Islands. The Tektite program was funded by NASA and was the first scientists-in-the-sea program sponsored by the U.S. government.  The Seabees also constructed a 12 hut base camp at Viers that is used today as the Virgin Islands Environmental Resource Station.

Unit awards 

ACB 2 has received several unit citations and commendations. Members who participated in actions that merited the award are authorized to wear the medal or ribbon associated with the award on their uniform. Awards and decorations of the United States Armed Forces have different categories, i.e. Service, Campaign, Unit, and Personal.  Unit Citations are distinct from the other decorations. The following unit awards are 2's:  ACB 2 was the first CB awarded the Joint Meritorious Unit Award.  Also receiving the award were 100 men from ACB 1 that were attached to ACB 2 at that time.

 Joint Meritorious Unit Award 1986
 Navy Unit Commendation
 Navy Unit Commendation 
 Navy Meritorious Unit Commendation 
 Navy Meritorious Unit Commendation

Campaign and Service Awards

Asiatic-Pacific Campaign Medal with one bronze star (105 NCB)
 Philippine Liberation Medal with two bronze stars (105 NCB) 
 World War II Victory Medal (105 NCB)
 National Defense Service Medal Vietnam
 Humanitarian Service Medal Feb–Mar 1976 1976 Guatemala earthquake
 Humanitarian Service Medal –  ACB-2 Det, Evacuation of Beirut 1976 
 Armed Forces Expeditionary Medal  – ACB-Det, Invasion of Grenada 1983
 National Defense Service Medal War on Terror  
 Southwest Asia Service Medal

The Battalion also qualified for the Golden Anchor Award for retention excellence in FY 01 and FY 03.

With over 1,100 active duty and reserve men and women, Amphibious Construction Battalion TWO provides the U.S. Atlantic Fleet with the ship-to-shore link so vital to success in amphibious operations.

See also
Admiral Ben Moreell
Amphibious Construction Battalion 1 (ACB-1)
Civil Engineer Corps United States Navy
Naval Construction Battalion aka Seabee
Naval Mobile Construction Battalion 1
Naval Mobile Construction Battalion 3
Naval Mobile Construction Battalion 4
Naval Mobile Construction Battalion 5
Naval Mobile Construction Battalion 11
Naval Mobile Construction Battalion 25
Naval Mobile Construction Battalion 133
Naval Construction Battalion Center (Gulfport, Mississippi)
Naval Construction Battalion Center Port Hueneme
Naval Amphibious Base Little Creek
Naval Amphibious Base Coronado
Seabees in World War II
Seabees Memorial

References

External links
 ACB Two
 NAVDOCKS-100, January 1944, U.S. Naval Construction Battalion Administration Manual

105 NCB & ACB 2 Unit Histories and Cruisebooks search "deployment completion reports"
NMCB 62 Alumni website

Seabees
Seabee units and formations
Military in Virginia Beach, Virginia
Military units and formations established in 1950
Military units and formations of the Iraq War
Units and formations of the United States in the War in Afghanistan (2001–2021)